James Desmond Peplinski (born October 24, 1960) is a Canadian former National Hockey League (NHL) player.  He played ten seasons in the NHL (all with the Calgary Flames) and won the Stanley Cup in 1989. He represented Canada at the 1988 Winter Olympics as a member of the national hockey team.

Playing career
Peplinski played junior hockey for the Toronto Marlboros of the Ontario Major Junior Hockey League (OMJHL) between 1977 and 1980. He scored 101 points in 67 games in his final season of junior.  The Atlanta Flames selected him with their fourth round selection, 75th overall, at the 1979 NHL Entry Draft.  Following the franchise's relocation to Canada, he made his NHL debut in 1980 and was an original member of the Calgary Flames, scoring 38 points in his rookie season. Playing his 100th career game on November 17, 1981, Peplinski scored four goals against the Winnipeg Jets as part of a career high 30-goal, 67-point season in the 1981–82 season.

One of Peplinski's strengths was his durability.  He missed only 24 games during his career, appearing in all 80 of the Flames' games in 1980–81, 1982–83, 1984–85 and 1986–87.  He was named a tri-captain of the team, shared with Lanny McDonald and Doug Risebrough, in the 1984–85 season.  For the 1988 Winter Olympics, the International Ice Hockey Federation opened the hockey tournament to all professionals.  While the NHL refused to allow most of its players to participate, the Flames released Peplinski to the Canadian Olympic team. He appeared in seven games, scoring one assist for the fourth place Canadians.

In the Flames' Stanley Cup championship season of 1988–89, Peplinski scored 38 points in 79 games, and appeared in 20 more games in the 1989 Stanley Cup Playoffs. Prior to the sixth game of the final against the Montreal Canadiens, head coach Terry Crisp wanted to insert McDonald, who was expected to retire following the season, into the lineup for the possible clinching game.  As a result, Peplinski was scratched from the line-up and watched as the team won the championship.  He came onto the ice to accept the trophy with McDonald and alternate captain Tim Hunter.

Six games into the 1989–90 NHL season, Peplinski chose to retire. He left the game as the Flames' all-time leader in games played at 705. He moved to the broadcast booth, joining Hockey Night in Canada as a color commentator before attempting an NHL comeback in 1994–95. His comeback lasted six more games before he left the game for good.  Peplinski settled in Calgary after his retirement and remains active with the team's alumni association.  He organized the alumni game between the Flames and Canadiens at the 2011 Heritage Classic.

Peplinski has the longest goal streak among the NHL players without scoring a power-play goal - 124, from his last power play goal on November 23, 1982 against the Washington Capitals and until his retirement.

Personal life
Upon retiring from the Flames, Peplinski invested in Hartfield Chieftain Leasing, a small vehicle leasing company. Starting with 565 units, split between operations in Calgary and Edmonton, the company initially struggled. In 1998, the company was thriving and merged with his father-in-law's leasing company in the East (Leasemaster), creating a national vehicle leasing firm, Jim Peplinski Leasing Inc. Peplinski remains the Chairman of Jim Peplinski Leasing which serves small to mid-sided fleet vehicles across the country. 

Peplinski is also the Chairman of Properly Investment Company, a firm established to invest in entrepreneurs looking to take their business to the next level. 

Peplinski has been recognized on multiple occasions for his charitable contributions, particularly those supporting children. He was named the final recipient of the Charlie Conacher Humanitarian Award in 1984 for his work in support of the Special Olympics and Big Brothers of Calgary.  The Flames named him their recipient of the Ralph T. Scurfield Humanitarian Award in 1988.

Peplinski is married to Catherine (née Esplen), and they have four children together.

Arena 1 in the Jim Durrell Centre is named Jim Peplinski Arena.

Career statistics

Regular season and playoffs

International

References

External links 

''Note: During Jim Peplinski's tenure as captain of the Flames he shared the role of captain with Doug Risebrough (1984–87) and Lanny McDonald (1984–89), and then served as sole captain for the first six games of 1989–90, before retiring.

1960 births
Atlanta Flames draft picks
Calgary Flames captains
Calgary Flames players
Canadian ice hockey forwards
Ice hockey people from Ontario
Ice hockey players at the 1988 Winter Olympics
Living people
National Hockey League broadcasters
Olympic ice hockey players of Canada
People from Renfrew County
Stanley Cup champions
Toronto Marlboros players
Businesspeople from Calgary
Edmonton Oilers announcers